Cory Withrow (born April 5, 1975 in Spokane, Washington) is a former American football center in the National Football League. He was signed by the Minnesota Vikings as an undrafted free agent in 1999. He played college football at Washington State.

Withrow has also played for the San Diego Chargers and St. Louis Rams.

Early years
Withrow attended Mead High School in Spokane, Washington and was a letterman in football, basketball, and baseball. In football, he was an All-State honoree as an offensive lineman and as a defensive lineman. In baseball, he was a three-year letterwinner. Cory Withrow graduated from Mead High School in 1993.

College career
Withrow played college football at Washington State University.

Professional career
Withrow previously played for the Minnesota Vikings and later signed with the San Diego Chargers where he played in a backup role to center Nick Hardwick. Withrow suffered an injury while with the Chargers that led to the signing of veteran center Jeremy Newberry. He was eventually released when he agreed to an injury settlement with the Chargers.

Seattle Seahawks
Withrow signed with the Seattle Seahawks on July 31, 2009. He was placed on season-ending injured reserve on September 2.

The King's Craft
In the early 2010's, Withrow founded The King's Craft Coffee Co, which is based in Poway, CA.

External links
Seattle Seahawks bio
King's Craft About Us

1975 births
Living people
Players of American football from Spokane, Washington
American football offensive guards
American football centers
Washington State Cougars football players
Minnesota Vikings players
San Diego Chargers players
St. Louis Rams players
Seattle Seahawks players